HL-2M is a research tokamak at the Southwestern Institute of Physics in Chengdu, China. It was completed on November 26, 2019 and commissioned on December 4, 2020. HL-2M is now used for nuclear fusion research, in particular to study heat extraction from the plasma.

References

Tokamaks
Fusion reactors